Gina Riley (born 6 May 1961) is an Australian actress, writer, singer and comedian, known for portraying Kim Craig in the television series Kath & Kim, and for her work in musical theatre.

Television and film
Riley became a popular television performer in the sketch shows Fast Forward, its successor Full Frontal, Big Girl's Blouse and Something Stupid. In the latter she was also a producer and writer. On Fast Forward, Gina Riley sent-up such singers as Tina Arena, Paula Abdul, Bette Midler, Sinéad O'Connor and Dannii Minogue as well as Australian personalities Kerri-Anne Kennerley and Jacki MacDonald. She later appeared in The Games, a spoof behind-the-scenes look at the organising committee of the Sydney Olympics.

She has enjoyed great success as Kim Craig in Kath & Kim, written and created by Riley and her long-time writing partner and friend Jane Turner. Riley also works frequently with Magda Szubanski.

Riley starred as Kim in the Kath and Kim feature film Kath & Kimderella.  The film opened in Australia on 6 September 2012 and despite negative reviews from critics it was a box office success having grossed $6,150,771.

In 2015, Riley appeared in an episode of Please Like Me.

Stage
In 1987, she played the part of 'Chrissie' (loosely based on rock singer Chrissy Amphlett) in Phil Motherwell's musical play Fitzroy Crossing which enjoyed successful seasons and rave reviews at LaMama Theatre, in Carlton, Victoria. The music for the play was composed by Joe Dolce.

Riley has also had some roles in musical theatre. In 1992 and 1993, she appeared on stage as Janet in The New Rocky Horror Show; she is included on the cast album.  In 1994, she played Trina in Sydney Theatre Company's production of Falsettos, winning a Green Room Award for its Melbourne season.  In 1998, she played The Baker's Wife in a Melbourne Theatre Company production of Into the Woods. In 2009, she played Matron "Mama" Morton in a production of Chicago.

In 2019, Riley starred as Mrs. Lovett in Sweeney Todd: The Demon Barber of Fleet Street opposite Anthony Warlow.

Personal life
Riley is married to Rick McKenna. Parents of Max McKenna (born 1996) a singer and actor who portrayed Muriel in the original Sydney production of Muriel's Wedding in 2017 and starred as Zoe Murphy in the Dear Evan Hansen US National Tour in 2018. Max identifies as trans non-binary.

In March 2013 Riley revealed she was being treated for breast cancer. It was later reported that she has since made a full recovery.

Riley makes relatively few public appearances as herself. One notable exception was on Enough Rope with Andrew Denton, where she and Turner both appeared as themselves.

Filmography
(as performer)

References

External links 

Look at moi: The many faces of Gina Riley (photo gallery), The Sydney Morning Herald

1961 births
Living people
Actresses from Melbourne
Australian people of Greek descent
Australian women comedians
Comedians from Melbourne
Australian screenwriters
Australian film actresses
Australian television actresses
Writers from Melbourne
20th-century Australian actresses
21st-century Australian actresses